Framingham Pigot is a village and civil parish in the English of Norfolk.

History
Framingham Earl's name is of Anglo-Saxon origin and derives from the Old English for the village or homestead of Fram's people. The addition of 'Pigot' was added due to the fact the village was part of the estates of the Picot family in the Thirteenth Century.

In the Domesday Book, Framingham Pigot is listed alongside Framingham Earl as a settlement of 61 households in the hundred of Henstead. In 1086, the villages were divided between the East Anglian estates of King William I, Bishop Odo of Bayeux, Roger Bigod and Godric the Steward.

Framingham Hall was a manor-house built in the parish in the Eighteenth Century, with the wooded grounds around the hall being planted by the Rigby family. The hall was demolished in the 1970s.

Geography
According to the 2011 Census, Framingham Pigot has a population of 153 residents living in 66 households.

Framingham Pigot falls within the constituency of South Norfolk and is represented at Parliament by Richard Bacon MP of the Conservative Party. For the purposes of local government, the parish falls within the district of South Norfolk.

St. Andrew's Church
Framingham Pigot's parish church is dedicated to Saint Andrew and dates from the Nineteenth Century. St. Andrew's was built on the site of a previous round-tower church under the leadership of Robert Kerr, and paid for by George Christie. There are various examples of stained-glass installed by the workshops of Hardman & Co., Franz Mayer of Munich, Archibald Keightley Nicholson and Clayton and Bell.

Amenities
Framingham Pigot has two remaining public houses, the Old Feathers and the Gull Inn. The Highway Nursery, a garden centre, is also located in the parish.

Notable Residents
 Bryan Gunn (b.1963)- Scotland and Norwich City goalkeeper and manager
 Susan Gunn (b.1965)- British artist
 Munya Chawawa (b.1992)- Anglo-Zimbabwean actor and comedian
 Angus Gunn (b.1996)- Norwich City goalkeeper

War Memorial
Framingham Pigot's war memorials take the form of a carved marble plaque for the fallen of the First World War and a framed paper certificate for the Second World War. The memorial lists the following names for the First World War:
 Cpt. Julian F. Gray MC (1885-1917), 1st Field Coy., Royal Engineers
 AB Cecil G. Rivett (1898-1917), 5th (Nelson) Bn., 63rd (Royal Naval) Division
 Pvt. Clifford J. Tomlinson (1898-1917), 10th Bn., Lincolnshire Regiment
 Pvt. Arthur T. Barker (d.1917), 9th Bn., Royal Norfolk Regiment

And, the following for the Second World War:
 Cpt. Patrick R. Lockett (1919-1943), 17th/21st Lancers att. Royal Armoured Corps
 Lt. David W. J. Colman (1921-1942), 2nd Bn., King's Royal Rifle Corps
 Cpl. Guy R. Taylor (1919-1942), 22nd (Fortress) Coy., Royal Engineers
 Pvt. Alfred B. Cushing (1911-1940), 2nd Bn., Royal Norfolk Regt.
 Pvt. Leonard W. G. Cain (1919-1944), 7th Bn., Royal Norfolk Regt.

References

External Links

Villages in Norfolk
South Norfolk
Civil parishes in Norfolk